Bayéré Junior Loué (born 14 January 2001) is an Ivorian footballer who plays as a forward for Hammarby IF in Allsvenskan.

Early life
Loué was born in Abidjan, Ivory Coast, but grew up in Tunisia where he started to play football at age nine with Espérance de Tunis. He later moved back to his native country, where he represented local club Olympique Sport d’Abobos before joining the prestigious academy of ASEC Mimosas in his teens.

Club career

Hammarby IF
On 23 May 2019, Loué joined Swedish side Hammarby IF on loan, together with ASEC teammate Aziz Ouattara Mohammed, after a successful trial. Both players completed a permanent transfer on 30 December the same year, signing four-year deals with the club.

In 2020, Loué went on loan to Hammarby's affiliated club IK Frej in Division 1, Sweden's third tier. He spent the vast majority of the season nursing a knee and thigh injury, and ultimately played four league games as the club finished 9th in the table. 

On 20 February 2021, Loué made his competitive debut for Hammarby, in a 4–1 home win against AFC Eskilstuna, in the group stage of the main domestic cup, Svenska Cupen. On 30 May 2021, Loué won the 2020–21 Svenska Cupen with Hammarby, through a 5–4 win on penalties (0–0 after full-time) against BK Häcken in the final.

On 15 September 2021, Loué was sent on loan to Železničar Pančevo in the Serbian First League for the remainder of the year.

Personal life
He is the son of former professional footballer Edgar Loué.

Career statistics

Club

Honours

Club
Hammarby IF
 Svenska Cupen: 2020–21

References

External links

2001 births
Living people
Association football forwards
Ivorian footballers
Espérance Sportive de Tunis players
ASEC Mimosas players
Hammarby Fotboll players
IK Frej players
FK Železničar Pančevo players
Allsvenskan players
Ettan Fotboll players
Serbian First League players
Ivorian expatriate footballers
Expatriate footballers in Tunisia
Ivorian expatriate sportspeople in Tunisia
Expatriate footballers in Sweden
Ivorian expatriate sportspeople in Sweden
Expatriate footballers in Serbia
Ivorian expatriate sportspeople in Serbia